Urophora sjumorum is a species of tephritid or fruit flies in the genus Urophora of the family Tephritidae.

Distribution
Turkey, Caucasus & Kazakhstan, Cyprus, Israel & Pakistan

References

Urophora
Insects described in 1937
Diptera of Asia
Diptera of Europe
Taxa named by Boris Rohdendorf